Bill Purcell may refer to:

 Bill Purcell (mayor) (born 1953), former mayor of Nashville, Tennessee
 Bill Purcell (ice hockey), ice hockey coach
 Bill Purcell (footballer) (1905–1986), Australian footballer

See also
 Bill Pursell, American pianist
 William Purcell (disambiguation)